The Polish Ombudsman (literally Advocate for Citizens' Rights, now referring to itself in English as the "Commissioner for Human Rights" and earlier as the "Human Rights Defender," often abbreviated RPO) is an independent central office of the Republic of Poland. The office was first established on January 1, 1988. Its functioning is regulated by the Constitution and an act of Polish parliament (Sejm) from July 15, 1987. The office is accredited as Poland's national human rights institution.

Responsibilities and powers of the Polish Ombudsman 
Polish law entrusts the ombudsman with four responsibilities with respect to citizen rights:
 prevention
 diagnosis
 monitoring
 creativity

The ombudsman, deputies and the office protect the freedom and rights of the people. They monitor current events. In case they find that due to intentional actions (or lack thereof) by agencies, organizations or institutions which are duty bound to respect freedoms and rights of the people, these freedoms and rights were violated, they undertake action. In such cases, they can act on behalf of the people in courts. The office can undertake such actions only if a thorough analysis of the situation shows that the rights or the freedoms of the people were infringed, and only if such analysis recognizes the need for the ombudsman to be involved in a case. The people have the right to ask the ombudsman for intervention.

Election, recall and term of office 
 The ombudsman is elected by an act of Sejm and has to be accepted by the Senate.
 The term of office is five years long and the same person cannot hold the office more than twice.
 Sejm has the right to recall the ombudsman with a 3/5 majority before the end of term.

The ombudsman election and status conflict 2020-2021 
In September 2020, the term of office of the incumberent ombudsman (Adam Bodnar) was supposed to expire, but the Sejm and the Senate had not agreed on a successor. This was an unforeseen complication. The Polish law did not provide for an interim office in case the term. The incumbent Ombudsman thus remained in office, awaiting the appointment of a new one.

However, for five months, the two parliament chambers did not succeed to agree on a successor, in spite of several tries. Twice the Sejm (where the parties in government were in majority) voted down the opposition candidate, the lawyer Zuzanna Rudzińska-Bluszcz. Once the Sejm appointed the government's candidate, Deputy Foreign Minister Piotr Wawrzyk, who however was not confirmed by the Senate (where the opposition parties were in majority).

On 15 April 2021 the Polish Constitutional Tribunal which has been controlled by the governing Law and Justice party almost since it took power in 2015, decided that Bodnar could stay in office as a temporary Ombudsman until a new one was elected, but only for a short time, and that he anyhow must vacate the office after at most three further months. The same day, the Sejm appointed government candidate Bartłomiej Wróblewski as new ombudsman, to be considered for approval by the Senate (with 240 MPs voting "for", 201 "against", and 11 abstaining).

List of Polish Ombudsmen

References

External links 
 Official site (in English)
 Ombudsman's duties

 
Government of Poland
Human rights in Poland
Ombudsman posts